The Aero A.17 was a small sailplane built in Czechoslovakia and first flown in 1922. The conventional sailplane wing and tail were held together by an open truss framework, which also supported the pilot.

Specifications (Aero A.17)

See also

References 

Glider aircraft
1920s Czechoslovakian sailplanes
Aircraft first flown in 1922